Wrath of the Seas or When Fleet Meets Fleet (German: Die versunkene Flotte) is a 1926 German silent war film directed by Graham Hewett and Manfred Noa and starring Bernhard Goetzke, Agnes Esterhazy and Nils Asther. It portrays the Imperial German Navy during the First World War, particularly the Battle of Jutland and is based on a novel by Helmut Lorenz.

Cast
 Bernhard Goetzke as Korvettenkapitän Barnow  
 Agnes Esterhazy as Erika Barnow  
 Nils Asther as Torpedooffizier Günther Adenried
and in alphabetical order
 Hans Albers as Oberheizer Tim Kreuger  
 Bobbie Bender as Fähnrich  
 Henry Bender as Röwers Kompanion 
 Eugen Burg as Wilhelm H. Elsberg  
 Heinrich George as Obermaat Röwer 
 Käthe Haack as Anna Sass, "Wirtin der Weltkugel"  
 Dary Holm as Hilde Elsberg  
 Hans Mierendorff as Kapitän des "Großherzog"  
 Werner Pittschau as Kapititänleutnant Fritz Kämpf  
 Camilla Spira 
 Henry Stuart as Commander Norton  
 Otz Tollen

References

Bibliography
 Bock, Hans-Michael & Bergfelder, Tim. The Concise CineGraph. Encyclopedia of German Cinema. Berghahn Books, 2009.

External links

1926 films
Films of the Weimar Republic
Films directed by Manfred Noa
German silent feature films
World War I naval films
German black-and-white films
German war films
1926 war films
Silent war films
Silent adventure films
1920s German films
1920s German-language films